Macrothyatira danieli is a moth in the family Drepanidae first described by Werny in 1966. It is found in Nepal.

References

Moths described in 1966
Thyatirinae
Moths of Asia